is a song by Japanese singer-songwriter Mai Kuraki. The song was released as second single from her tenth studio album Over the Rainbow on May 25, 2011.

In popular culture 
"Mō Ichido" served as the theme song to the television series Kiri ni Sumu Akuma.

Track listing

Release history 

2011 singles
Mai Kuraki songs
Song recordings produced by Daiko Nagato